The Italian Camp at the Battle of Magenta is an 1862 oil on canvas painting by Giovanni Fattori, now in the Gallery of Modern Art in Palazzo Pitti in Florence. It shows a scene from the battle of Magenta on 4 June 1859 during the Second Italian War of Independence.

References

War paintings
1862 paintings
Paintings in the collection of the Gallery of Modern Art (Florence)
Second Italian War of Independence
Paintings by Giovanni Fattori